A-Sides is a 1997 compilation album by Soundgarden.

A-Sides may also refer to:
A-side, the featured song of a music single
A Sides (Brooke Fraser album), a 2016 compilation album
The A-Sides, a 2000s American indie rock band

See also

B-Sides (disambiguation)